Krali may refer to
Krali Bimbalov (1934–1988), Bulgarian wrestler 
Krali Marko Crag, a rocky ridge in Antarctica
Krali Marko, Pazardzhik Province, a village in southern Bulgaria
Kapıcılar Kralı (King of Housekeepers), a 1976 Turkish comedy film 
Amphimallon krali a species of beetle